Binnenmaas was a municipality in the western Netherlands, in the province of South Holland. It is named after the lake of the same name.

The municipality was formed on January 1, 1984, by the merger of the municipalities Puttershoek, Maasdam, Mijnsheerenland, Westmaas, and Heinenoord. On January 1, 2007, the municipality 's-Gravendeel was added to Binnenmaas. On January 1, 2019 it was merged with Cromstrijen, Korendijk, Oud-Beijerland, and Strijen to form the municipality of Hoeksche Waard.

The municipality of Binnenmaas consists of the following communities: Blaaksedijk, De Wacht, Goidschalxoord, 's-Gravendeel, Greup, Heinenoord, Kuipersveer, Maasdam, Maasdijk, Mijnsheerenland, Puttershoek, Reedijk, Schenkeldijk, Sint Anthoniepolder, Westdijk, Westmaas and Zwanegat.

Topography

Dutch Topographic map of the municipality of Binnenmaas, June 2015.

See also

References

External links

Official website

Hoeksche Waard
Former municipalities of South Holland
Municipalities of the Netherlands disestablished in 2019